Cliff Gustafson (February 12, 1931 – January 2, 2023) was an American high school and college baseball coach who was, for twenty-nine seasons, the head coach of the Texas Longhorns, representing the University of Texas at Austin.

Early life
Gustafson was a native of Kenedy, Texas.  He attended the University of Texas at Austin and played college baseball for the Texas Longhorns, including the 1952 team that won the Southwest Conference championship and reached the College World Series. Gustafson posted a .308 batting average for his collegiate career and went on to play professional baseball.

Coaching career

South San Antonio High School 
After briefly playing baseball professionally, Gustafson embarked on a successful 14-year-high school coaching career that began in 1953 at South San Antonio High School in San Antonio, Texas. During his 14 seasons at South San, Gustafson's teams won the Class 3A State Championships an impressive six times: 1958, 1959, 1961, 1963, 1964, 1967.

The University of Texas 
In 1968, after hanging up initially on University of Texas football coach & athletic director, Darrell Royal (Gustafson thought it was a prank phone call) Gustafson took a pay cut to coach the baseball team at The University of Texas at Austin.  While there, he led the Longhorns to twenty-two Southwest Conference Championships, a record seventeen College World Series appearances, with finals appearances resulting in two national championships in 1975 and 1983.

Many of Gustafson's players went on to play Major League Baseball. Among that group are Jim Acker, Billy Bates, Mike Brumley, Mike Capel, Roger Clemens, Dennis Cook, Scott Coolbaugh, Keith Creel, Kirk Dressendorfer, Ron Gardenhire, Jim Gideon, Jerry Don Gleaton, Burt Hooton, Bob Kearney, Brooks Kieschnick, Keith Moreland, Calvin Murray, Spike Owen, Karl Pagel, Mark Petkovsek, Shane Reynolds, Andre Robertson, Bruce Ruffin, Calvin Schiraldi,  J.D. Smart, Greg Swindell, Jose Tolentino, Richard Wortham, and Ricky Wright. Coach Gustafson has been inducted into the University of Texas Hall of Honor (1983), American Baseball Coaches Association Hall of Fame (1992) and the Texas Sports Hall of Fame (1994). He was named National Coach of the Year in baseball in 1983 and awarded the 1998 James Keller Sportsmanship Award. He was also named an inaugural member of the College Baseball Hall of Fame in 2006.

Head coaching record

After coaching 
Until his death, Gustafson resided at his home in Austin, Texas.

Gustafson died on January 2, 2023, at the age of 91.

Achievements 
National Championships:  1975, 1983

SWC Championships:  1968, 1969, 1970, 1971, 1972, 1973, 1974, 1975, 1976, 1979, 1980, 1981, 1982, 1983, 1984, 1985, 1986, 1987, 1988, 1991, 1992, 1996

SWC Tournament Championships:  1979, 1980, 1981, 1982, 1983, 1984, 1987, 1988, 1990, 1991, 1994

Collegiate Career Record:  (1968–1996):  1466-377-2 (.795)

NCAA Tournament Record:  122–55 (.689)

National Coach of the Year:  1982, 1983

College World Series appearances:  1968, 1969, 1970, 1972, 1973, 1974, 1975, 1979, 1981, 1982, 1983, 1984, 1985, 1987, 1989, 1992, 1993

Coached 35 First Team All Americans, 12 Second Team All Americans, and 9 Third Team All Americans

Inducted into the American Baseball Coaches Association Hall of Fame.

Inducted into the Texas Sports Hall of Fame.

Named an inaugural member of the National College Baseball Hall of Fame in 2006.

Gustafson's Longhorns had a 39–0 record against minor league & semi-pro teams in exhibitions.

See also

List of college baseball coaches with 1,100 wins

References

1931 births
2023 deaths
Texas Longhorns baseball coaches
Texas Longhorns baseball players
High school baseball coaches in the United States
National College Baseball Hall of Fame inductees
People from Kenedy, Texas
Baseball coaches from Texas
Baseball players from Austin, Texas